Seyed Behdad Esfahbod MirHosseinZadeh Sarabi (born September 27, 1982) is an Iranian-Canadian software engineer and free software developer. He was a software engineer at Facebook from February 2019 until July 1st, 2020; before that he was a Senior Staff Software Engineer at Google since 2010, and before that at Red Hat.

Education 
Esfahbod holds an MBA from the University of Toronto, Rotman School of Management and a Master of Science degree from the University of Toronto in Computer Science, and a Bachelor of Science degree from Sharif University in Computer Engineering, Software.

While at high school Esfahbod won a silver in the 1999 International Olympiad in Informatics and then gold in 2000.

Notable projects 
Esfahbod was among the founders of Sharif FarsiWeb Inc. which carried out internationalization and standardization projects related to open source and Persian language.
He was a director at GNOME Foundation from 2007 to 2010, serving as the president from 2008 to 2009.

Esfahbod is an expert on font engineering and internationalization, a frequent speaker at workshops and conferences. He has contributed to many open-source projects. Among the projects, he has led are the Cairo, fontconfig, HarfBuzz, and Pango libraries, which are standard parts of the GNOME desktop environment, the Google Chrome web browser, and the LibreOffice suite of programs. He received an O'Reilly Open Source Award in 2013 for his work on HarfBuzz.

Detention Iran visit
Esfahbod was arrested by the Islamic Revolutionary Guards Corps intelligence echelon during a 2020 visit to Tehran. He was then moved to Evin prison, where he was psychologically pressured and interrogated in solitary confinement for 7 days. They downloaded all his private data from his devices. Iranian security forces let him go based on his promise to spy on his friends once he was back in the United States.

References

External links 
 Behdad Esfahbod's personal homepage
Behdad Esfahbod's Twitter

1982 births
Living people
Open source people
Free software programmers
GNOME developers
People involved with Unicode
Canadian engineers
Iranian engineers
Canadian people of Iranian descent
People from Sari, Iran
University of Toronto alumni
Sharif University of Technology alumni
Facebook employees
Google employees
Red Hat employees
Iranian software developers